Mthokozisi Shezi, born 9 September 1987 in Pietermaritzburg, is a South African cricketer who played in the 2006 Under-19 Cricket World Cup in Sri Lanka. His first-class and List A cricket has been for KwaZulu-Natal and Dolphins.

He made his One Day International debut against Zimbabwe in August 2014. He was included in the South Western Districts cricket team for the 2015 Africa T20 Cup. In August 2017, he was named in Durban Qalandars' squad for the first season of the T20 Global League. However, in October 2017, Cricket South Africa initially postponed the tournament until November 2018, with it being cancelled soon after.

References

External links
 

1987 births
Living people
South African cricketers
South Africa One Day International cricketers
Eastern Province cricketers